Constellation is a performing arts nightclub in Chicago, Illinois, "with an emphasis on forward-thinking practices particularly in the areas of jazz, improvised, experimental, and contemporary classical music."

Constellation was founded in 2013 by Mike Reed, a Chicago-based drummer and composer. Reed was originally Constellation's for-profit (nominally) owner and then, from 2018 through at least 2021, its nonprofit organization president. 

Constellation has replaced, and expanded upon, the now-closed Velvet Lounge as a hub of avant garde jazz and improvised music in Chicago.  Musicians who have played at Constellation include Fred Hersch, Bobby Broom, Ari Brown, Josh Berman, and many others.

See also
List of jazz clubs

References

External links
 

Music venues completed in 2013
Jazz clubs in Chicago
2013 establishments in Illinois